The Moroccan Communist Party was a political party in Morocco. The party was established in November 1943 on the basis of the individual communist groups that had been active in Morocco since 1920. The founding general secretary of the party was Léon Sultan. After Sultan's death in 1945, Ali Yata became the party general secretary.

History
The first congress of the Moroccan Communist Party, held in April 1946 issued an appeal to the people of Morocco to join forces in the struggle for independence, for democratic freedoms and improving the situation of the workers. In the manifesto "For the unification and independence of Morocco", issued in August 1946, the party the need to create a united national front. Communists actively participated in armed struggles against the French colonial authorities in the period 1953–1956. After the proclamation of the sovereign State of Morocco in 1956, the party advocated strengthening national independence, the evacuation of foreign troops from Morocco, the elimination of foreign military bases, liberation of the country from foreign domination monopolies, for the nationalization of banks, mining companies, agrarian reform, raising the standard of living of the masses. The party was banned at several occasions, and its leaders were harassed by authorities. In July 1968 the Moroccan Communist Party founded the Party of Liberation and Socialism, which was banned in 1969. In 1974, this party was re-founded as the Party of Progress and Socialism (PPS), which is today one of the major left-wing parties in Morocco and scored sixth (with 5.4% of the votes) in the Moroccan parliamentary election, 2007.

Publications
Until the party was banned in 1964, it released a daily newspaper Al-Mukafih, and a weekly, Hayat ech Chaab, from 1945 to 1956.

References

1943 establishments in Morocco
1964 disestablishments in Morocco
Banned communist parties
Communist parties in Morocco
Defunct political parties in Morocco
Political parties established in 1943
Political parties disestablished in 1964